An advertiser is an entity that advertises.

Advertiser is also the name of several newspapers around the world:

 The Advertiser (Adelaide), Adelaide, South Australia, Australia (preceded by The South Australian Advertiser)
 The Advertiser (Bendigo), Bendigo, Victoria, Australia
 The Advertiser (1922–1939), successor to the Evelyn Observer
 Albany Advertiser, Western Australia (for a while called Australian Advertiser)
 Anderson Valley Advertiser, a weekly newspaper in Anderson Valley, California, United States
 The Croydon Advertiser, London, England, United Kingdom
 Edinburgh Advertiser, defunct newspaper of Edinburgh, Scotland, United Kingdom
 Geelong Advertiser, a daily newspaper of  Geelong, Victoria, Australia 
 Melbourne Advertiser, defunct newspaper of Melbourne, Victoria, Australia

See also
 The Daily Advertiser (disambiguation)
 Daily Gazetteer, of London, England, published as the Daily Gazetteer or London Advertiser 1746–1748, the Gazetteer and London Daily Advertiser 1753–1764, and the Gazetteer and New Daily Advertiser 1764–1796